Grundig a German consumer electronics manufacturer.

Grundig may also refer to:

People
Hans Grundig (1901–1958), German painter and graphic artist
Lea Grundig (1906–1977), German painter and Graphic artist
Max Grundig (1908–1989), founder of electronics company Grundig

Other uses
Grundig Business Systems (GBS), a German company 
Grundig mobile, a mobile phone brand in Spain 
Grundig (band), later called Cold

See also